"Nation X" (also known as "X-Men: Nation X") is a 2009–2010 crossover storyline published by Marvel Comics featuring the X-Men. Published in the aftermath of the "Utopia" storyline and dealing with the return of Magneto, the story appeared across several different books, including Uncanny X-Men #515–522, Nation X #1–4 and X-Men: Legacy #228–230. Its writers include James Asmus, Matt Fraction, Grace Randolph, Scott Snyder, Simon Spurrier, and Chris Yost, and its artists include Leonard Kirk, Mike Allred, Terry Dodson, Greg Land and Whilce Portacio.

Premise
The storyline dealt with the aftermath of the "Utopia" and the return of Magneto. Along with the main run in Uncanny X-Men, a 4-issue anthology series title Nation X was released along with Nation X: X-Factor One Shot. Also the Deadpool arc "Want You to Want Me" acts as an unofficial tie-in to the main storyline.

Plot synopsis

Deadpool
Since Deadpool becomes super rich he has no need for being a mercenary and tried to be pirate, which he soon gave up on. Instead, he decides to help the X-Men on Utopia. Cyclops disagrees instantly, but Deadpool is later put on the team on probation, under the watchful eye of Domino. Deadpool decides to help the X-Men by settling a dispute between Mercury and her father (paid by Norman Osborn to make the X-Men look bad). Deadpool hunts the man down and threatens to kill him only for the man to also be hunted down by H.A.M.M.E.R. Deadpool pretends to be the bad guy and is willingly defeated by the X-Men, making them look like heroes again. Deadpool then leaves, while Cyclops admits that Wade "has some skill".

Uncanny X-Men

Shortly after the funeral of Dr. Yuriko Takiguchi on Utopia (previously known as the first Asteroid M), Magneto confronts the new inhabitants of his former home. Magneto stuns everyone by telling them he has come in peace and wishes to speak with Cyclops.

Professor Xavier is unconvinced, believing the entire ruse to be a trap and attacks him telepathically. In spite of this, Magneto does not fight back. Instead, he gets down on his knees and repeats his peaceful intentions. Cyclops orders Xavier to stand down and agrees to talk with Magneto, but keeps Psylocke close by in case Xavier is right. Magneto explains how he and the High Evolutionary restored his powers and his intention to use the process to reverse the Decimation effect. But since the High Evolutionary's equipment was destroyed in the process of repowering Magneto, this is now impossible. He also reveals that he has been in space since then trying to find another way of saving mutantkind, but to no avail. Magneto expresses his admiration to Cyclops for finally doing what he and Xavier couldn't: uniting mutantkind together. Magneto fears that mutantkind is doomed until Cyclops tells him that Hope Summers, the Mutant Messiah is alive and well. Meanwhile, Scalphunter was recently kidnapped by a group of non-mutant superhumans. They proclaim to want to save all of mutantkind, but force him to fly a plane (which secretly contains five mutant-eating creatures) towards Utopia. Nightcrawler is sent to investigate Scalphunter's intentions as he approaches the island. Upon teleporting to the plane, he retreats to the surface screaming for Cyclops to shoot the plane down before it can land. Cyclops shoots at the plane.

When the five Predator Xs attack Utopia, the X-Men, Namor, and Magneto band together and kill them.

While Professor X helps Cyclops extract the Void from Emma Frost, Magneto helps the X-Men into keeping Utopia from sinking due to the extra weight from the other mutants.

After becoming disillusioned about Cyclops' judgement of having Magneto join up with them, Beast leaves the team.

The latest issue revealed that the villains who had previously kidnapped Scalphunter and released the Predator Xs against the X-Men - named as Lobe, Verre, Burst, Thug and Bouncing Betty - were Sublime's associates, after they are defeated by Wolverine, Psylocke, Colossus and Fantomex. It also showed Magneto heading up to the top of Mount Tamalpais on a mission of his own, while the others at first question what he is doing, eventually X-Club discover that he is bringing back Kitty Pryde, who was last seen trapped inside a giant bullet hurling through space.

X-Men: Legacy
Emplate reappears on the former site of the Xavier Institute, where he kills a few construction workers currently working on the site. He later reappears on Utopia and after watching Madison Jeffries and Danger, he attacks them; after taking out Danger, he manages to sample Jeffries. The X-Men arrive and after defeating them he fades back to his reality. There he reveals to D.O.A. that Penance is no longer with them but from the information he gathered from Jeffries, he sets his sights on Bling.[1]

Emplate captures Bling! and brings her to his dimension. After a brief struggle with Bling!, Emplate proceeds to feed upon her, causing her to pass out. After talking to D.O.A. and feeling his tormentors approaching, Emplate prepares to feed again so he may survive his next encounter with them. He enters Bling!'s prison and after Bling! manages to get a bit of his backstory, he feeds on her again and goes to his tormentors telling them to feast and be damned.[2]

When Rogue comes after Emplate trying to rescue Bling!, D.O.A. sends some vicious creatures to attack and kill her. He informs Emplate of Rogue's rescue attempt and he decides to kill Bling! in case the X-Men are tracking him through her. Rogue escapes the creatures and teams up with Bling! in a surprise attack on him when he tries to feed on her one last time.[3] During the fight, Rogue and Emplate absorb each other's powers and continue to fight until Rogue returns to her body. Emplate's house is brought to the X-Men's Utopia where, thanks to the X-Club, he becomes trapped. He attempts a final time to kill Bling! but Bling!, together with Rogue, knock him out and send him back to his dimension where he is tormented by the beasts in the Glass Moon.

Nation X
The Nation X miniseries focuses on short and mostly trivial stories centered in one character or a small group during their settlement in Utopia. Although the stories do not have a direct relation of continuity among them, some of them indicate the greater problems in the island, such as lack of food and water.

Characters focused on the stories include Magneto, Wolverine, Nightcrawler, Iceman, Colossus, Northstar, Gambit, No-Girl, Armor, Danger, Magik, Anole, Madison Jeffries, Cannonball, Emma Frost, the Stepford Cuckoos, Warpath, Loa, Rockslide, Match, Sub-Mariner and Storm. Non-residents of Utopia were also featured in some stories, like Jubilee and Doop.

Reading order
This is based on the release dates of the issues:

September 2009
 Deadpool vol. 2 #15
 X-Men: Legacy Annual #1
 Uncanny X-Men #515

October 2009
 Deadpool vol. 2 #16
 Uncanny X-Men #516
 X-Men: Legacy #228

November 2009
 Deadpool vol. 2 #17
 X-Men: Legacy #229
 Uncanny X-Men #517

December 2009
 Uncanny X-Men #518
 Nation X #1
 Deadpool #18
 X-Men: Legacy #230
 Uncanny X-Men #519

January 2010
 Nation X: X-Factor #1
 Nation X #2
 Uncanny X-Men #520

February 2010
 Uncanny X-Men #521
 Nation X #3

March 2010
 Nation X #4
 Uncanny X-Men #522

Bibliography
 Uncanny X-Men #515–522
 Nation X #1–4
 Nation X: X-Factor #1
 Deadpool vol. 2, #15–18
 X-Men: Legacy #228–230, Annual #1

Collected editions
The various titles are being collected into individual volumes:

X-Men: Nation X (collects Uncanny X-Men #515–522, Dark Reign: The List – X-Men and Nation X 1–4, 344 pages, May 2010)
X-Men Legacy: Emplate (collects X-Men: Legacy #228–230, and Giant-Size X-Men: Legacy, 112 pages, premiere hardcover, March 2010)

References

External links
 

Comics by Matt Fraction